The Nehru Institute of Mountaineering (NIM India) in Uttarkashi in Uttarakhand is an institute that was established on November 14, 1965. The institute was formed to honor the great desire of President Jawahar Lal Nehru, the first Prime Minister of India.

History 
Nehru Institute of Mountaineering was first proposed by the Ministry of Defence, the Government of India, and the Government of Uttar Pradesh in 1964.
The institute is built in Uttarkashi because it is close to the Gangotri region in Western Garhwali, which has good climbing and training potential in India.

In August 2022, the institute hosted the national sports climbing championship.

On Oct 4, 2022, a group of 29 trainee mountaineers from NIM were trapped in an avalanche at Draupadi Ka Danda peak in Uttarkashi district.

See also
Indian Institute of Skiing and Mountaineering
Himalayan Mountaineering Institute

References

Mountaineering training institutes
Education in Uttarakhand